Slow Century is a two-disc DVD retrospective of the band Pavement filmed and compiled by filmmaker Lance Bangs. The first disc contains Slow Century itself, a 90-minute documentary with extensive interviews with the band members (as well as their friend Thurston Moore) and considerable live concert footage from across their career featuring throughout; indeed, the film concludes with the encore from their final live show, held in London in 1999. There is also a presentation subtitled Cinema Stars (written using a star symbol rather than the word "star") featuring all their videos, as well as alternate and rejected clips for three songs. Interspersed throughout are brief clips from home movies, television appearances and behind-the-scenes footage. The second disc is entirely composed of live footage with a full concert from Seattle, Washington (July 1999) and edited highlights from the group's second last show in Manchester (11/1999). Across the two discs, there is a total of six hours of footage. There is band member and director commentary on each video and multiple angles on the second disc, and it is presented in Dolby stereo.

Directed by Lance Bangs, except:

 Kim Gordon (directed "Perfume-V" video)
 Thurston Moore (directed "Here" video)
 Dan Koretzky (directed "Cut Your Hair" video, co-directed the "Painted Soldiers" video)
 Rian Murphy (co-directed "Painted Soldiers" video)
 Scott Blen (directed "Gold Soundz" and "Range Life" videos)
 Tom Surgall (directed "Rattled by the Rush" video)
 John Kelsey (directed "Father to a Sister of Thought" and "Stereo" videos)
 Spike Jonze (directed "Shady Lane" video)

Track listing

 Slow Century, a 90-minute documentary incorporating footage from 1989–99
 "Here" (video)
 "Perfume-V" (video)
 "Cut Your Hair" (video)
 "Gold Soundz" (video)
 "Range Life" (video)
 "Rattled by the Rush" (video)
 "Father to a Sister of Thought" (video)
 "Painted Soldiers" (video)
 "Stereo" (video)
 "Shady Lane" (video)
 "Carrot Rope" (video)
 "Spit on a Stranger" (video)
 "Major Leagues" (video)
 "Major Leagues" (alternate video)
 "Rattled by the Rush" (alternate video)
 "Cut Your Hair" (alternate video)
 "In the Mouth a Desert" (live)
 "Speak See Remember" (live)
 "Spit on a Stranger" (live)
 "Date with Ikea" (live)
 "The Hexx" (live)
 "Box Elder" (live)
 "Folk Jam" (live)
 "Billie" (live)
 "Major Leagues" (live)
 "Shady Lane" (live)
 "Cream of Gold" (live)
 "Platform Blues" (live)
 "We Dance" (live)
 "Harness Your Hopes" (live)
 "Stereo" (live)
 "Gold Soundz" (live)
 "The Killing Moon" (live) (covering Echo & the Bunnymen)
 "Sinister Purpose" (live)
 "Debris Slide" (live)
 "Grounded" (live)
 "Unfair" (live)
 "Two States" (live)
 "Fin" (live)
 "Date with Ikea" (live)
 "Range Life" (live)
 "Summer Babe" (live)
 "Handcuffs" banter from last show (live) (hidden easter egg)
 "Unseen Power of the Picket Fence" (live) (hidden easter egg)
 "Conduit for Sale" (live) (hidden easter egg)

Easter egg 
 On disc one, highlight the letter "P" in "Pavement" on the menu screen and then press enter/OK to unlock some hidden performance footage.

External links 
 

Pavement (band) video albums
2002 video albums
Music video compilation albums
Live video albums
2002 live albums
2002 compilation albums
2000s English-language films